Igalia is a private, worker-owned, employee-run cooperative model consultancy focused on open source software. Based in A Coruña, Galicia (Spain), Igalia is known for its contributions and commitments to both open-source and open standards.  Igalia's primary focus is on open source solutions for a large set of hardware and software platforms centering on browsers, graphics, multimedia, compilers, device drivers, virtualization, embedded Linux, and device drivers.

Active projects 
Igalia is the current core maintainer of several projects, including:
 Two official WebKit ports
 WebKit WPE, a WebKit port optimized for embedded devices
 WebKitGTK, the GTK port of the WebKit web rendering engine used in GNOME desktop applications.
 GNOME Web (also known as Epiphany), the GNOME web browser
 Orca, a screen reader that provides access to the graphical Linux desktop via user-customizable combinations of speech and braille.
 Wolvic, a web browser built for extended reality.

Igalia is a major contributor to each of the major Web engines (Blink, Gecko/Servo and WebKit).  In 2019 they were the #2 committers to both the WebKit and Chromium codebases and in the top 10 contributors to Gecko/Servo.
Igalia has helped the interoperability of some features across web engines; they implemented CSS Grid Layout in WebKit and Blink.
They are maintainers for several areas of the Chromium codebase, such as CSS Grid Layout, MathML, Ozone-Wayland and MathML in Chromium.

Igalia also has significant participation in open source communities, contributing to several projects, such as Mesa, GStreamer, Node.js, and Wayland.

Past projects and historical involvement 

Igalia was previously significantly involved in:

 Maemo and MeeGo.  Igalia developers authored Grilo (a framework for the access to multimedia sources like YouTube, Flickr, Jamendo, and others), and managed LibrePlan (a project management web application), OCRFeeder (an OCR suite for GNOME) and Skeltrack (a Free Software library for skeleton tracking from depth images).

Memberships 
Igalia maintains active memberships and participation in a number of foundations and standards consortia:
 Linux Foundation, including the Automotive Grade Linux (AGL) project.
 A founder of the GNOME Mobile & Embedded Initiative.
 The World Wide Web Consortium (W3C) — Igalia is a member since 2013.
 The Khronos Group.
 ECMA International — Igalia is a member since 2018 where they participate in TC39.
 WHATWG.
 GENIVI® Alliance.
 The Software Freedom Conservancy (SFC).
 The Electronic Frontier Foundation (EFF).
 AGASOL.
 Past member of the GNOME Foundation Advisory Board.

References

External links 
 

Companies based in Galicia (Spain)
Free software companies
GNOME companies
Linux companies
Software companies of Spain